Kyle Brockton Kalis (born December 21, 1993) is an American football guard and center who is currently a free agent. He was selected as a first-team All-American by Sports Illustrated and Parade magazine during his senior year in high school, as well as the number one recruit in Ohio for the class of 2012. He became one of the top recruits in the 2012 college football recruiting class. Kalis played college football for the Michigan Wolverines, where he went on to start 47 games at right guard. He was signed by the Washington Redskins as an undrafted free agent in 2017.

Early years
Kalis is the son of Todd Kalis, an offensive lineman who played eight years in the NFL with the Vikings, Steelers and Bengals. He was the only freshman on the varsity football team at Seneca Valley High School in Harmony, PA. He played the remainder of his high school football career at St. Edward High School in Lakewood Ohio near Bay Village, where he lived with his mother, Stephanie Garvin Schwarz.  In December 2011, he was one of five offensive linemen selected by Sports Illustrated for its high school football All-America first-team.  In January 2012, he was also named to Parade magazine and U.S. Army All-American football teams.  He was one of six finalists for the Anthony Munoz Lineman of the Year Award, presented to the best high school lineman in the United States.

Recruiting
Kalis was one of the top-rated recruits in the 2012 college football recruiting class.  He was rated as a five-star prospect by both Rivals.com and Scout.com.  He was also a finalist for the U.S. Army Player of the Year award. He was rated as the No. 1 prospect from Ohio and the No. 4-ranked offensive tackle in the United States by Rivals.com.

In September 2010, Kalis verbally committed to Ohio State.  In July 2011, Kalis switched his commitment from Ohio State to Michigan in the wake of a memorabilia-for-gifts scandal that led to the resignation of head coach Jim Tressel.

College career

Kalis conveyed his commitment to Michigan head coach Brady Hoke from the "M" logo at the middle of the field at Michigan Stadium.  He also told reporters, "I believe the Michigan-Ohio border is now open. I think you're going to see eight or nine guys from the state of Ohio going over to Michigan this year." Kalis became the subject of threats from Ohio State fans.  Kalis commented on the threats as follows: ""There are really a lot of stupid people out there. I'd get people telling me they were going to come to my house with bats to tear my ACL. I got plenty of threats, even a few death threats. I gave my address out to about 20 people and told them to come find me. Nobody came."

Kalis enrolled at the University of Michigan in 2012. In late August 2012, the International Business Times selected Kalis as one of the five best incoming freshmen in the Big Ten Conference.  He played for the Wolverines from 2013 to 2016. Following the 2016 season, Kalis was named to the All-Big Ten offensive second-team, by both the coaches and media, and was named a Second-team All-American by the American Football Coaches Association.

Professional career

Washington Redskins
After going undrafted in the 2017 NFL Draft, Kalis signed with the Washington Redskins as an undrafted free agent on May 4, 2017. On September 2, 2017, he was waived by the team and was signed to the practice squad the next day.

Indianapolis Colts
On October 3, 2017, Kalis was signed by the Indianapolis Colts off the Redskins' practice squad. He soon earned playing time and saw his first offensive game action against the Bengals, starting the second half. He went on to start 2 more games, against the Texans, and the Steelers. He was waived/injured by the Colts on December 2, 2017.

Washington Redskins (second stint)
On December 4, 2017, Kalis was claimed off waivers by the Redskins, where he then remained inactive for the last 4 games of the season.

On September 1, 2018, Kalis was waived for final roster cuts before the start of the 2018 season.

Cleveland Browns

On September 3, 2018, Kalis was signed to the Cleveland Browns' practice squad. The Browns signed Kalis to their active roster on December 1, 2018.

Kalis was waived with an injury designation during final roster cuts on August 31, 2019, and subsequently reverted to injured reserve the next day. He was waived from injured reserve with an injury settlement on September 11.

Oakland / Las Vegas Raiders
On October 23, 2019, Kalis was signed to the Oakland Raiders practice squad. He was released on December 4, 2019. He was re-signed on December 11. On December 30, 2019, Kalis was signed to a reserve/future contract. He was waived on May 5, 2020.

References

External links
Michigan Wolverines bio

1993 births
Living people
All-American college football players
American football offensive linemen
Michigan Wolverines football players
Sportspeople from Lakewood, Ohio
Players of American football from Ohio
Washington Redskins players
Indianapolis Colts players
Cleveland Browns players
Las Vegas Raiders players
Oakland Raiders players